The 2017 Fitzgerald Glider Kits 300 was the seventh stock car race of the 2017 NASCAR Xfinity Series season and the 35th iteration of the event. The race was held on Saturday, April 22, 2017, in Bristol, Tennessee at Bristol Motor Speedway, a 0.533 miles (0.858 km) permanent oval-shaped racetrack. The race took the scheduled 300 laps to complete. At race's end, Erik Jones, driving for Joe Gibbs Racing, would take the lead with 20 to go to win his eighth career NASCAR Xfinity Series win and his second of the season. To fill out the podium, Ryan Blaney of Team Penske and Daniel Suárez of Joe Gibbs Racing would finish second and third, respectively.

Background 

The Bristol Motor Speedway, formerly known as Bristol International Raceway and Bristol Raceway, is a NASCAR short track venue located in Bristol, Tennessee. Constructed in 1960, it held its first NASCAR race on July 30, 1961. Despite its short length, Bristol is among the most popular tracks on the NASCAR schedule because of its distinct features, which include extraordinarily steep banking, an all concrete surface, two pit roads, and stadium-like seating. It has also been named one of the loudest NASCAR tracks.

Entry list 

 (R) denotes rookie driver.
 (i) denotes driver who is ineligible for series driver points.

*Withdrew due to concerns of rain.

Practice 
The only 55-minute practice session was held on Friday, April 21, at 2:00 PM EST.

Qualifying 
Qualifying was held on Saturday, April 22, at 9:35 AM EST. Since Bristol Motor Speedway is under 2 miles (3.2 km), the qualifying system was a multi-car system that included three rounds. The first round was 15 minutes, where every driver would be able to set a lap within the 15 minutes. Then, the second round would consist of the fastest 24 cars in Round 1, and drivers would have 10 minutes to set a lap. Round 3 consisted of the fastest 12 drivers from Round 2, and the drivers would have 5 minutes to set a time. Whoever was fastest in Round 3 would win the pole.

No drivers would fail to qualify.

Full qualifying results

Race results 
Stage 1 Laps: 85

Stage 2 Laps: 85

Stage 3 Laps: 130

Standings after the race 

Drivers' Championship standings

Note: Only the first 12 positions are included for the driver standings.

References 

2017 NASCAR Xfinity Series
NASCAR races at Bristol Motor Speedway
April 2017 sports events in the United States
2017 in sports in Tennessee